This article lists events that occurred during 2003 in Estonia.

Incumbents
President – Arnold Rüütel
Prime Minister – Siim Kallas (until 10 April); Juhan Parts (starting 10 April)

Events
March – elections for X Riigikogu took place.
21 April – the primary radar for airspace control was opened (part of BALTNET).

Births

Deaths

See also
 2003 in Estonian football
 2003 in Estonian television

References

 
2000s in Estonia
Estonia
Estonia
Years of the 21st century in Estonia